Chris & Wes: Let's Do This is a documentary reality show that was broadcast in the UK on Sky1 in December, 2011.

References

External links

Sky UK original programming
2010s British reality television series
2011 British television series debuts
2012 British television series endings
2010s British documentary television series